The New York Mycological Society is a nonprofit organization of people who share an interest in mycology as well as in mycophagy. The present NYMS was reincarnated in 1962 by the composer John Cage and a small group of other mushroom lovers and students, including illustrator Lois Long and noted mycologist Guy Nearing. 

The NYMS runs events and mushrooming walks throughout the greater NYC area. The society started from a class at The New School in 1959.

References

External links 
New York Mycological Society

Mycology organizations
Science and technology in New York City